The Lincoln Creek Snowshoe Cabin, built in 1931, is a cabin in Glacier National Park.  It has also been known as Lincoln Creek Cabin and as Building Inventory No. 617.

See also
Kootenai Creek Snowshoe Cabin
Lee Creek Snowshoe Cabin

References

Park buildings and structures on the National Register of Historic Places in Montana
Log cabins in the United States
Government buildings completed in 1931
National Register of Historic Places in Flathead County, Montana
Log buildings and structures on the National Register of Historic Places in Montana
1931 establishments in Montana
National Register of Historic Places in Glacier National Park
National Park Service rustic in Montana